The Battle of Franklin's Crossing, also known as the Deep Run Battle, took place near Fredericksburg, Virginia on June 5, 1863.  Union forces under General John Sedgwick skirmished with Confederate troops under General A.P. Hill during a reconnaissance to determine the movements and location of General Robert E. Lee's Army of Northern Virginia. Confederate forces repulsed the Union probe.  The small fight was the first action in the Gettysburg Campaign.

Background
On June 3, Robert E. Lee decided to begin his second invasion of Northern soil and accordingly ordered his army to evacuate the lines around Fredericksburg and move into the Shenandoah Valley. To cover the withdrawal, Lee left A.P. Hill's III corps, with orders to remain along the lines until the Army was safely away. Rumors of Lee's movements reached Union general Joseph Hooker almost immediately. To determine the validity of the various reports he was receiving he ordered the VI corps under John Sedgwick to conduct a reconnaissance in force on June 5.

The battle

On the morning of the 5th the VI corps led by the 26th New Jersey and 5th Vermont began crossing the Rappahannock River near Deep Run. The initial attempt at crossing was soon repulsed by Confederates entrenched in rifle pits on the southern bank. After artillery fire failed to dislodge the Confederates, Sedgewick ordered two regiments to cross in pontoon boats. The Union troops were able to successfully land the boats on the southern bank and overrun the rifle pits, capturing 35 prisoners. They then advanced up the bank to the edge of a woods where they encountered a strong detachment of Confederates supported by artillery. A hot fire fight ensued that was described as "severe" at times before the Union advance was halted and driven back across the river, suffering 57 casualties. When the Federals failed to attack again, Hill withdrew the following day to rejoin the army.

Aftermath
By successfully defeating the Union reconnaissance party, A.P. Hill convinced Sedgwick that Lee still held Fredericksburg in force. Accordingly, Hooker remained along the Rappahanock giving Lee a valuable head start on his invasion. However, Hooker remained unsure of Lee's true position and intentions and accordingly ordered a reconnaissance by his Cavalry, which resulted in the Battle of Brandy Station on June 9.

Notes and references

External links
RootsWeb: VAWBTSVETS-L CLASH AT FRANKLIN'S CROSSING
Battle of Franklins Crossing

Franklin's Crossing
Franklin's Crossing
Franklin's Crossing
Spotsylvania County in the American Civil War
Stafford County in the American Civil War
Franklin's Crossing
Franklin's Crossing
1863 in Virginia
June 1863 events